Kunora e Lurës is a mountain in Albania. Kunora e Lurës has a rocky face and is included in the Lura National Park, which was established in 1966.

References

Mountains of Albania